Pakistan sent a delegation to compete at the 1996 Summer Paralympics in Atlanta, United States. Its lone representative was cyclist, Bahadur Khel.

References 

Nations at the 1996 Summer Paralympics
1996
Summer Paralympics